Henry Allan Hartley (October 25, 1921 – May 27, 2003) known professionally as Al Hartley, was an American comic book writer-artist known for his work on Archie Comics, Atlas Comics (the 1950s precursor of Marvel Comics), and many Christian comics. He received an Inkpot Award at the 1980 San Diego Comic-Con.

Hartley was the son of Congressman Frederick Allan Hartley, Jr., a New Jersey Republican remembered in history for the Taft-Hartley Act.

Biography

Early life and career
Al Hartley was born in Kearny, New Jersey, the son of Hazel Hartley and Congressman Frederick Allan Hartley, Jr. (Republican from New Jersey), co-author of the Taft-Hartley Act of 1947. He had a brother, Jack, and a sister, Lorraine. Their father, Hartley said, "encouraged me. He knew I wanted to draw from the time I could hold a crayon.... My father wanted me to pursue my own dreams and never attempted to steer me in any other direction." Hartley drew for the local newspaper while still in high school, and studied at the Art Students League of New York. He began selling humorous spot illustrations to magazines, and drew a Western comic-book story about Tecumseh for the publisher Street & Smith before the U.S. joined World War II, after which he enlisted in the U.S. Army Air Corps and flew 20 missions as a B-17 Flying Fortress bomber pilot in Europe.

On his return, he became a commercial artist and made the rounds of comic-book publishers, quickly getting work with publisher Ned Pines' Standard Comics and its imprints Better Publications and Nedor Publishing. There he drew his first known credited work, the backup feature "Roger Dodger" in Exciting Comics #51–67 (Sept. 1946 – May 1949). Hartley also did humor one- and two-pagers for the publisher's America's Best Comics #20–28 (Dec. 1946 – Nov. 1948), as well as the feature "Zippie" in The Fighting Yank, and pieces for Startling Comics and Wonder Comics.

During this time he also did the backup features "Debbie" and "Teen Tales" in Michel Publications' Cookie, The Funniest Kid in Town; and "Peg" for ACG's The Kilroys. As well, his work appeared in the titles All Romances, Dotty, Dotty and Her Boyfriends, and Vicky for A. A. Wyn, Inc.'s Ace Comics.

Patsy (and Hedy)
In 1949, Hartley began freelancing for editor Stan Lee at Timely Comics, the progenitor of Marvel Comics. Hartley recalled,

As Timely segued into Atlas Comics, Marvel's 1950s predecessor, Hartley made his mark with a more than decade-long run on the Patsy Walker teen-girl titles. With writer-editor Lee, Hartley chronicled the redheaded high schooler's lightly comic adventures in her namesake series (which ran through 1964) and in its spin-offs, Patsy and Hedy (which ran through 1967) and the single-issue A Date with Patsy (Sept. 1957). Well into the Marvel era, Hartley also drew the "Special Queen Size Annual" publication Patsy Walker's Fashion Parade #1 (1966). Walker eventually would be integrated into mainstream Marvel Universe continuity in the 1970s as the supernatural superheroine Hellcat, long after Hartley had left the character.

Also for Atlas, Hartley co-created Leopard Girl with writer Don Rico in Jungle Action, and drew such features as "The Black Rider" in Wild Western, and "Cliff Mason, White Hunter" in Jungle Tales. Hartley drew as well for the horror/suspense titles Mystic, Spellbound, Strange Tales, Adventures into Terror, and Mystery Tales, among many other Atlas books.

Silver Age of Comic Books
For Marvel in the 1960s, Hartley drew a single superhero comic: an episode of the Norse god superhero feature "Thor" in Journey into Mystery #90. He recalled that "superheroes weren't really my forte. I don't recall the circumstances that led me to draw that story. At that stage of the game, I was mostly doing work that I was more comfortable with, mostly teenage and humor stories." Harley dabbled in Marvel scripting on two stories: the "Iron Man" feature in Tales of Suspense #68 (Aug. 1965), and the last "Giant-Man" feature, in Tales to Astonish #69 (July 1965).

Among Marvel miscellanea, Hartley drew the 1961–63 series Linda Carter, Student Nurse, which began as a humor comic then became a romance with issue #2. After fellow Atlas artist Joe Maneely was killed in an accident in 1958, Hartley succeeded him on writer Stan Lee's syndicated comic strip Mrs. Lyon's Cubs. Hartley had done a short-lived gag-panel cartoon, Suburbia, the year before.

As well, he said, "There was one point in the early 1960s when I was Stan's assistant for about two months. I didn't feel comfortable in that position, so I went back to freelancing. As Stan's assistant, frankly, I did everything I normally did, and did some of the things that Stan did. I edited and wrote stories. I don't recall doing art corrections on anyone else's work."

Christian comics
In 1967, feeling "sterile, numb, and filled with fear", Hartley became a born again Christian, as did his wife, Hermine. At the time, he was among several artists who drew the black-and-white, "nudie cutie" secret-agent feature "Pussycat"
that ran in some of Marvel publisher Martin Goodman's men's magazines; Hartley told the publisher that he couldn't continue.

He began writing and drawing for Archie Comics, infusing some of the stories with his Christian beliefs. At one point he was directed to cut back. "I knew God was in control, so I respected my publisher's position and naturally complied". He later received a call from publisher Fleming H. Revell, for whom he then freelanced a comic-book adaptation of David Wilkerson's The Cross and the Switchblade in 1972, quickly followed by adaptations of God's Smuggler by the pseudonymous Brother Andrew and The Hiding Place by Corrie ten Boom. Inspired, Hartley helped launch the Spire Christian Comics line, and pitched Archie president John L. Goldwater to let him license the Archie characters. The Jewish Goldwater, himself religious, agreed, and Spire went on to release 59 comics – at least 19 of them Archie titles, along with six Bible stories, 12 biography adaptations, four other book or film adaptations (including Hansi: The Girl Who Loved the Swastika), and nine children's comics.

Comics writer Kathleen Webb wrote,

Book illustration
Hartley wrote a 1977 memoir, Come Meet My Friend! (New Life Ventures) (F. H. Revell), and a 1997 inspirational hardcover, It Takes a Family: How to Create Hope and Celebrate Your Future (Barbour Publishing, # ).

Personal life
Hartley and his wife of 61 years, Hermine, had two children, Fred and Alana. Hartley died May 27, 2003, aged 81, at Health Park Medical Center in Fort Myers, Florida.

References

External links
 The Unofficial Handbook of Marvel Comics Creators
 Spire Christian Comics fan site with scans. WebCitation archive.

1921 births
2003 deaths
20th-century American writers
20th-century American artists
People from Kearny, New Jersey
People from Fort Myers, Florida
Writers from New Jersey
Artists from New Jersey
American children's book illustrators
Golden Age comics creators
Silver Age comics creators
Archie Comics
Atlas Comics
Marvel Comics people
Christian comics creators
Evangelical writers
Converts to evangelical Christianity
Inkpot Award winners